Baxter Art Gallery was an art exhibition space at the California Institute of Technology, founded by Professor of Literature David R. Smith in 1971, and David Smith became the first gallery director. The little gallery nationally known for its daring exhibits of contemporary art. When it closed in 1985 for financial reasons, the Archives of American Art at the Smithsonian Institution requested all its records. The board of governors considered to relocate the gallery, then in 1989, it in collaboration with the Pasadena Arts Workshop became the Armory Center for the Arts.

In memory of the gallery, several original exhibition posters are hanging in the Baxter Hall, Caltech.

References

External links
 Archives of American Art: Baxter Art Gallery records, 1968-1990

Art museums and galleries in California
Museums in Pasadena, California
Contemporary art galleries in the United States
Art galleries established in 1971
Art galleries disestablished in 1985
California Institute of Technology buildings and structures